Marcel Adelon (20 February 1886 – 30 October 1968) was a French sports shooter. He competed in two events at the 1924 Summer Olympics.

References

External links
 

1886 births
1968 deaths
French male sport shooters
Olympic shooters of France
Shooters at the 1924 Summer Olympics
Sport shooters from Paris